The Fifth Sun is an Iranian Drama, Sci-Fi series. The series is directed by Alireza Afkhami. The series has also been aired on iFilm since November 2021.

Storyline 
A student of mechanics, Mohsen (Hamid Goudarzi) and his close friend Homayoun (Shahram Ghaedi) are living in poor economic conditions in 1985. They find an Inscription that can travel in time, and Mohsen travels with Antique for 24 years. Mohsen, who encounters new and far-fetched phenomena and there he falls in love with a girl named Homa (Shabnam Gholikhani). Other things happen to Mohsen that he is forced to go back to 1985 and...

Cast 
 Hamid Goudarzi
 Shabnam Gholikhani
 Maryam Kavyani
 Shahram Ghaedi
 Anoushirvan Arjmand
 Mahvash Sabrkon
 Mehdi Solooki
 Pendar Akbari
 Kamiyar Mohebi
 Niloufar hooshmand
 Asgar Ghods
 Hassan Najafi
 Nasim Geramipour
 Mohammad Matin Heidarinia
 Nabioallah Pirhadi
 Reza Tavakoli
 Ali Mirzaei

References

External links
 

2010s Iranian television series
Iranian television series